The 32nd meridian of longitude west from Washington is a line of longitude approximately 109°3′5.194″ west of the Prime Meridian of Greenwich.  In the United States of America, the meridian 32 degrees west of the Washington Meridian defines the western boundaries of the State of Colorado and the State of New Mexico and the eastern boundaries of the State of Utah and the State of Arizona.

History
On February 28, 1861, the Act Organizing the Territory of Colorado defined the western boundary of the new territory as the 32nd meridian of longitude west from Washington.  The creation of the Colorado Territory moved the eastern boundary of the Territory of Utah west to this meridian.

Two years later on February 24, 1863, the Act Organizing the Territory of Arizona defined the eastern boundary of the new territory as the 32nd meridian of longitude west from Washington.  This in turn moved the western boundary of the Territory of New Mexico east to this meridian.

These boundaries on the 32nd meridian of longitude west from Washington remained when Colorado became a state on August 1, 1876, Utah became a state on January 4, 1896, New Mexico became a state on January 6, 1912, and Arizona became a state on February 14, 1912.  The point of intersection of these four states, known as the Four Corners, is the only place in the United States where four states touch.

Longitude in the United States

Latitude and longitude uniquely describe the location of any point on Earth.  Latitude may be simply calculated from astronomical or solar observation, either at land or sea, interrupted only by cloudy skies.  Longitude, on the other hand, requires both astronomical or solar observation and some form of time reference to a longitude reference point.  John Harrison produced the first precise  marine chronometer in 1761.

The completion of the first North American electrical telegraph line between Washington and Baltimore on May 24, 1844, introduced a technology that could transmit time signals nearly instantly.   On September 28, 1850, the United States adopted two primary meridians of longitude for official use:  the Greenwich Meridian (through the old Royal Observatory at Greenwich, England) for all nautical and international use, and the Washington Meridian (through the old United States Naval Observatory in Washington, D.C.) for more accurate astronomical and domestic use.  The completion of the first telegraph line across North America on October 24, 1861, allowed time signals from the Naval Observatory in Washington to be transmitted across the continent.

The United States used the Washington Meridian as the longitude reference for most states and territories created between 1861 and 1868.  The completion of the first permanent transatlantic telegraph cable on July 28, 1866, allowed the Naval Observatory at Washington to be synchronized with the Royal Observatory at Greenwich.  The need for a separate national meridian for the United States gradually faded, and in 1884, U.S. President Chester A. Arthur called the International Meridian Conference in Washington which selected the meridian of the Royal Observatory at Greenwich as the international Prime Meridian.  On August 12, 1912, the United States adopted the Prime Meridian of Greenwich for all uses, domestic and international.

References

Borders of Arizona
Borders of Colorado
Borders of New Mexico
Borders of Utah
Arizona Territory
Colorado Territory
New Mexico Territory
Utah Territory
Meridians (geography)